Aikoku may refer to:

Aikoku, Obihiro, Hokkaido
Aikoku (motorbike)

People with the given name
, Japanese boxer

Japanese masculine given names